Fritz Odemar (13 January 1890 – 6 June 1955) was a German film actor. He appeared in more than 150 films between 1927 and 1955. He was born in Hannover, Germany and died in Munich, Germany. Odemar's father was the actor Fritz Odemar Sr. (Karl Julius Friedrich Odemar; 1858–1926).

Selected filmography

 The Merry Vineyard (1927) - Knuzius, Klärchens Verlobter
 The Devious Path (1928) - Möller, Regierungsrat
 The Last Fort (1929) - Lieutenant Brand
 Crucified Girl (1929)
 Napoleon at Saint Helena (1929) - Lt. Nichols
 Scandalous Eva (1930) - Lämmerberg
 The Song Is Ended (1930) - Der Verlager / The Editor
  (1930)
 The Stolen Face (1930) - Hempel
 Petit officier... Adieu! (1930) - Teschner
 Wibbel the Tailor (1931) - Fitzke
 Madame Pompadour (1931) - Minister Maurepas
 1914 (1931) - Prince Lichnowsky
 The Man in Search of His Murderer (1931)
 Three Days of Love (1931)
 The Merry Wives of Vienna (1931) - Johann - Kammerdiener
 Täter gesucht (1931) - Dorner, Diener
 That's All That Matters (1931) - Kriminalkommissar Schierling
 M (1931) - Cheater
 The Theft of the Mona Lisa (1931) - Direktor des Louvre
 I'll Stay with You (1931)
 Liebeskommando (1931)
 Bobby Gets Going (1931) - Felix
 The Captain from Köpenick (1931) - Stadtkämmerer Rosenkrantz
 No Money Needed (1932) - Schröder
 Things Are Getting Better Already (1932)
 Scandal on Park Street (1932)
 A Mad Idea (1932) - Werner Schubart
 A Shot at Dawn (1932) - Dr. Sandegg
 Quick (1932) - Headwaiter
 I Do Not Want to Know Who You Are (1932) - Fritz von Schröder
 The Heath Is Green (1932)
 Spoiling the Game (1932) - Lißmann - Prokurist
 The Testament of Cornelius Gulden (1932) - Bobby Liechenstein
 Haunted People (1932)
 Thea Roland''' (1932)
 When Love Sets the Fashion (1932)
 A Door Opens (1933) - Jonny Schlichting
 What Men Know (1933) - Oberpostsekretär Haber
 The Emperor's Waltz (1933)
 A Woman Like You (1933) - Herr von Hohensee
 The House of Dora Green (1933) - Dimitri
 The Star of Valencia (1933) - Kapitän Rustan
 Die Nacht der großen Liebe (1933) - The Counsul
 A Certain Mr. Gran (1933) - Der traurige Herr
 Roman einer Nacht (1933) - Staatsrat Munck
  (1933) - Fritz, Kellner
 The Castle in the South (1933) - Der Regisseur
 The Love Hotel (1933) - Spitzbein, Kammerdiener
 Victor and Victoria (1933) - Douglas
 Ich kenn' dich nicht und liebe dich (1934) - Baron Nicki
 Just Once a Great Lady (1934)
 The Double (1934) - Trentner, Diener bei Harry Selsbury
 Miss Madame (1934) - Alfred, Oberkellner
 The Flower Girl from the Grand Hotel (1934) - Der Diener Hermann
 The Switched Bride (1934) - Bittner
 The Four Musketeers (1934) - Ortskommandant
 ...heute abend bei mir (1934) - Mr. Martin, branch manager
 Ich sing mich in dein Herz hinein (1934) - James, ihr Chauffeur
  (1934) - Baron Tabanes, Ministerpräsident
 Charley's Aunt (1934) - Bressett
 Herr Kobin geht auf Abenteuer (1934) - Kurt Dannenberg, Kriminalkommissar
 Count Woronzeff (1934) - Onkel Gregor
 Farewell Waltz (1934) - Grabowsky, trader
 The English Marriage (1934) - Percival Mavis
  (1934) - Dr. Bratt
 Peer Gynt (1934) - Silvan
 Between Two Hearts (1934) - Rudolf Kämmerer
 The Old and the Young King (1935) - Hotham
 Wenn ein Mädel Hochzeit macht (1935) - Schönlein
 Knockout (1935) - Der Theaterdirektor
 Großreinemachen (1935) - Der Diener Brock
 The Fight with the Dragon (1935) - Bihold
 The King's Prisoner (1935) - Jomelli
 Leutnant Bobby, der Teufelskerl (1935) - Jack Stanley, ihr Gatte
 Lady Windermere's Fan (1935) - Lord Augustus
 The Schimeck Family (1935) - Anton Kaltenbach
 The White Horse Inn (1935) - Dr. Siedler, Lawyer
 The Young Count (1935) - Josua
 Springtime in Vienna (1936) - Lionel, sein Kammerdiener
 A Strange Guest (1936) - Onkel Théophile
 The Accusing Song (1936) - Baron Brix
 The Hound of the Baskervilles (1937) - Dr. Watson
 Togger (1937) - Mariano
 The Voice of the Heart (1937) - Graf Lossez
 Heimweh (1937) - Webster, Haupt der Schmugglerbande
 Serenade (1937) - P.M. Dörffner, Bratsche
 The Beaver Coat (1937) - Fürst August Sigismund
 Das große Abenteuer (1938) - Theaterdirektor Hessel
 Rätsel um Beate (1938) - Konsul Dieckhoff
 Frühlingsluft (1938) - Prinz Eduard
 Discretion with Honor (1938) - Diener
 The Deruga Case (1938) - Hofrat Dr. Mäulchen
 Spaßvögel (1939) - Vogelsang
 Castles in the Air (1939) - Walter
 Der arme Millionär (1939) - Jean, Kammerdiener
 Kitty and the World Conference (1939) - Sir Horace Ashlin
 Verwandte sind auch Menschen (1940) - Washington Schulze
 Mein Mann darf es nicht wissen (1940) - Vater Korn
 Frau nach Maß (1940) - Dr. Paul Buchmann
 Kleider machen Leute (1940) - Graf Stroganoff
 Der Herr im Haus (1940) - Menarek
 Der Sündenbock (1940) - Friedrich Wilhelm Pfeiffer
 Blutsbrüderschaft (1941) - Mr. Cunnings
 Carl Peters (1941) - Count Pfeil
 Happiness is the Main Thing (1941) - Generaldirektor Zimmermann
 Goodbye, Franziska (1941) - Professor Tiemann
 Familienanschluß (1941) - Geschäftsmann Timm
 Kleine Mädchen - große Sorgen (1941) - Dr. Paul Hartung, Arzt
 Leichte Muse (1941) - Forschungsreisender Dr. Cramer
 Sein Sohn (1942) - Richard Flemming, Generalmusikdirektor
 Anuschka (1942) - Baron Fery
 The Little Residence (1942) - Herzog von Lauffenburg
 Vom Schicksal verweht (1942) - Prof.Freemann
 Stimme des Herzens (1942) - Dr. Overhoff
 Einmal der liebe Herrgott sein (1942) - Hoteldieb Pawlowitsch
 Love Premiere (1943) - Werner Rombach, Musikverleger
 Circus Renz (1943) - Herr von Grunau
 Reise in die Vergangenheit (1943) - Professor Hans Kemmerer, Pianist
 A Man With Principles? (1943) - Friedrich Weiden, Christls Vater
 Die schwache Stunde (1943) - Tenor Valentin
 Das Lied der Nachtigall (1944) - Fürst Monterniccolo
 Das schwarze Schaf (1944)
 Sieben Briefe (1944) - Mr. Burger
 Der Täter ist unter uns (1944) - Ladislaus von Pontembsky
 Hundstage (1944) - Generaldirektor Behring
 A Man Like Maximilian (1945) - Maximilian Holten
 Der Fall Molander (1945)
 Das seltsame Fräulein Sylvia (1945)
 Geld ins Haus (1947)
 Ghost in the Castle (1947) - J.M. - Mauritius
 Film Without a Title (1948) - Writer
 The Time with You (1948) - Lawyer
 Night of the Twelve (1949)
 Encounter with Werther (1949) - Graf
 Viennese Girls (1949) - (uncredited)
 Artists' Blood (1949) - Steffens - Fabrikbesitzer
 Der große Fall (1949)
  (1949) - Martin - Diener bei Pistolecrone
 Who Is This That I Love? (1950) - Diener Michael
 Wedding Night In Paradise (1950) - Otto Röders
 Scandal at the Embassy (1950) - Gefängnisdirektor
 Crown Jewels (1950)
 Begierde (1951) - Der Bankpräsident
 Geheimnis einer Ehe (1951)
 The Thief of Bagdad (1952) - Ibrahim
 Scandal at the Girls' School (1953) - Fürst Maximilian
 Mask in Blue (1953) - Theaterdirektor Corelli
 Ludwig II'' (1955) - General von der Tann

References

External links

Fritz Odemar at Virtual History

1890 births
1955 deaths
20th-century German male actors
German male film actors
German male silent film actors
Actors from Hanover